Monique Iborra (born 8 March 1945 in Maison-Carrée, Algeria) is a member of the National Assembly of France.  She represents the Haute-Garonne department, and was most recently elected in 2017 as a member of La République En Marche!, previously a deputy of the Socialist Party.

Political career
In parliament, Iborra serves as member of the Committee on Social Affairs. In 2019, she unsuccessfully ran for the post of the committee's chair.

In 2019, French farmers protesting against the Comprehensive Economic and Trade Agreement (CETA) between Canada and the European Union dumped manure overnight outside Iborra's office; the National Federation of Agricultural Holders' Unions (FDSEA) later claimed responsibility for the vandalism.

Other activities
 Haut Conseil de la famille, de l'enfance et de l'âge (HCFEA), Member

References

1945 births
Living people
People from Algiers Province
Pieds-Noirs
Socialist Party (France) politicians
Women members of the National Assembly (France)
La République En Marche! politicians
21st-century French women politicians
Deputies of the 13th National Assembly of the French Fifth Republic
Deputies of the 14th National Assembly of the French Fifth Republic
Deputies of the 15th National Assembly of the French Fifth Republic
Members of Parliament for Haute-Garonne